Woman Hating: A Radical Look at Sexuality is the debut nonfiction book by American radical feminist writer and activist Andrea Dworkin. It was first published in 1974 by E. P. Dutton.

Background
While Dworkin was living in Amsterdam, she met Ricki Abrams, a prostitute and fellow expatriate. Abrams introduced Dworkin to early radical feminist writing from the United States, and Dworkin was especially inspired by Kate Millett's Sexual Politics, Shulamith Firestone's The Dialectic of Sex and Robin Morgan's Sisterhood Is Powerful. She and Abrams began to work together on "early pieces and fragments" of a radical feminist text on the hatred of women in culture and history, including a completed draft of a chapter on the pornographic counterculture magazine Suck, which was published by a group of fellow expatriates in the Netherlands.

Before Dworkin left Amsterdam, she spoke with Abrams about her experiences in the Netherlands, the emerging feminist movement, and the book they had begun to write together. Dworkin agreed to complete the book—which she eventually titled Woman Hating—and publish it when she reached the United States. In her memoirs, Dworkin relates that during that conversation she vowed to dedicate her life to the feminist movement:

Synopsis
Dworkin examines the place and depiction of women in fairy tales and pornography, focusing on the French erotic novels Story of O and The Image, and the magazine Suck. She then looks at the historical practices of Chinese foot binding and Medieval European witch burning from a radical feminist perspective. The book's final section discusses the concept of androgyny within various cultures' creation myths and argues for "the development of a new kind of human being and a new kind of human community" free from gender and gender roles.

Reception

Kirkus Reviews stated that Dworkin is "bright, entertaining and incisive when she is dissecting the roles available to men and women as articulated in fairy tales, Christian myths and contemporary pornography", and that "most of what she has to say is not nearly so preposterous."

References

1974 non-fiction books
American non-fiction books
Books by Andrea Dworkin
Debut books
E. P. Dutton books
English-language books
Feminism and sexuality
Feminist books
Non-fiction books about sexuality
Radical feminist books
Sociology books